The Goritsky Monastery of Dormition was a Russian Orthodox  monastery in  Pereslavl-Zalessky, Russia. 

It was supposedly established in the early 14th century during the reign of Ivan I of Moscow (Ivan Kalita). In 1382 Tokhtamysh Khan destroyed the town and the monastery with it. According to the legend, Grand Princess Eudoxia of Moscow arrived as a pilgrim the day before the attack and managed to escape the Horde on a raft, covered by fog of the Pleshcheyevo lake. In gratitude for the miraculous salvation, she rebuilt the monastery and established a tradition of Easter rides on rafts across the lake.

All the monastery's manuscripts were destroyed by a fire on June 12, 1722, which is why little is known about its history.

No original architecture was preserved. The oldest parts of the preserved ensemble date to the 17-18th centuries.

The monastery was closed in 1788. In 1919 the Pereslavl-Zalessky Historical Museum was established within its territory.

See also
Goritsky Monastery (Goritsy)

References

Sources 

Russian Orthodox monasteries in Russia
Pereslavl-Zalessky
Christian monasteries established in the 14th century
Buildings and structures in Yaroslavl Oblast
Cultural heritage monuments of federal significance in Yaroslavl Oblast